The hajj is a pilgrimage to Mecca performed by millions of Muslims every year, coming from all over the Muslim world. Its history goes back many centuries. The present pattern of the Islamic Hajj was established by Islamic prophet Muhammad, around 632 CE, who reformed the existing pilgrimage tradition of the pagan Arabs. According to Islamic tradition, the hajj dates from thousands of years earlier, from when Abraham, upon God's command, built the Kaaba (the "house of God"). This cubic building is considered the most holy site in Islam and the rituals of the hajj include walking repeatedly around it.

In medieval times, pilgrims would gather in cities like Basra, Damascus, and Cairo to go to Mecca in groups and caravans comprising tens of thousands of pilgrims. Some came from further afield in sailing ships. The Sultans of the Ottoman Empire supported the pilgrims, appointing the Amir al-Hajj ("Commander of the Hajj") to organise and lead the caravans. As other modes of transport including steamships and trains were introduced, pilgrims were able to make the trip to Mecca more quickly.

The nomadic tribes of the desert – known as Bedouin – had been a persistent security issue for the hajj caravans. The annual pilgrimage offered pilgrims as well as professional merchants the opportunity to conduct various merchandising activities both on route and in Mecca, Damascus, and Cairo. Through its history, the hajj has influenced literature and art as pilgrims have written guides and created artistic depictions of the holy sites and rituals.

Origin 
In Islamic tradition, pilgrimage was introduced during the time of prophet Hazrat Ibrahim (AS) (Abraham). According to tradition, by God's command, Abraham left his wife Hajira (Hajar) and his son Ishmael (Ismail) alone in the desert of ancient Mecca with little food and water that they soon used up. Mecca was then an uninhabited place. In search of water, Hajira desperately ran seven times between the two hills of Safa and Marwah but found none. Back in despair to Ishmael, she saw the baby scratching the ground with his leg and a water fountain underneath. Because of the presence of water, tribes started to settle in Mecca, Jurhum being the first such tribe to arrive. When grown up, Ishmael married in the tribe and started living with them. The Quran states that Hazrat Ibrahim (AS), along with his son Ishmael, raised the foundations of a house that is identified by most commentators as the Kaaba. After the placing of the Black Stone in the Eastern corner of the Kaaba, Hazrat Ibrahim (AS) received a revelation in which Allah(SAW) told the aged prophet that he should now go and proclaim the pilgrimage to mankind. Islamic scholar Shibli Nomani mentions that the house raised by Abraham was 27 feet high, 96 feet long, and 66 feet wide.

Pre-Islamic Arabia 
Pre-Islamic Arabs were worshippers of other  gods. The Kaaba was still the center of their worship, and was filled with idols and images of angels. During the annual pilgrimage season, people from home and abroad would visit the Kaaba. The Quraysh tribe was in charge of entertaining and serving the pilgrims. Shibli Nomani mentions that the pagan Arabs introduced some unholy rites during their pilgrimage. Unlike today's Hajj, they did not walk between the hills of Safa and Marwah and did not gather at Arafat. Some would maintain silence during the whole course of pilgrimage. Except for those from the Quraysh tribe, pilgrims would perform tawaf while naked. During the initial years of Muhammad's prophethood, the pilgrimage season offered Muhammad the occasion to preach Islam to the foreign people who came to Mecca for pilgrimage.

Muhammad and the Hajj 

The present pattern of the Hajj was established by Islamic prophet Muhammad who made reforms to the pre-Islamic pilgrimage of the pagan Arabs. Mecca was conquered by the Muslims in 630 CE. Muhammad then destroyed all the pagan idols, and consecrated the building to Allah. Next year, at the direction of Muhammad, Abu Bakr led 300 Muslims to the pilgrimage in Mecca where Ali delivered a sermon stipulating the new rites of Hajj and abrogating the pagan rites. He especially declared that no unbeliever, pagan, and naked man would be allowed to circumambulate the Kaaba from the next year. In 632 CE, shortly before his death, Muhammad performed his only and last pilgrimage with a large number of followers, and taught them  the rites of the Hajj and the manners of performing them. In the plain of Arafat, he delivered a famous speech – known as The Farewell Sermon – to those who were present there. From then, Hajj became one of the Five Pillars of Islam. Hajj was made compulsory in 09th Hijri.

In Medieval and Ottoman eras 

During medieval times, pilgrims would gather in the capital cities of Syria, Egypt, and Iraq to go to Mecca in groups and caravans comprising tens of thousands of pilgrims. The Muslim rulers would undertake the responsibility of the Hajj, and provide state patronage for organizing such pilgrimage caravans. To facilitate the pilgrimage journey, a road measuring 900 miles was constructed, stretching from Iraq to Mecca and Medina. The road's  construction was probably undertaken during the third Abbasid caliph al-Mahdi, father of fifth Abbasid caliph Harun al-Rashid, around 780 CE. It was later named the 'Way of Zubayda' (Darb Zubaidah),  after Harun's wife, as she is noted for conducting improvements along the route and furnishing it with water cisterns and eating houses for pilgrims at regular intervals. Both Harun and Zubayda performed the Hajj several times conducted improvement activities in Mecca and Medina.

A good deal of information on the medieval hajj comes from the firsthand observations of three Muslim travelers - Nasir Khusraw, Ibn Jubayr, and Ibn Battuta - who themselves performed the pilgrimage and recorded detailed accounts. Khusraw performed the hajj in 1050 CE. Starting his first journey from Granada in 1183 CE, Ibn Jubayr, a native of Spain, performed his pilgrimage in 1184 and then went to Baghdad. Ibn Battuta, a native of Morocco, left his home in 1325 and performed his pilgrimage in 1326 CE. After the fall of Baghdad in 1258 (during Mamluk period), Damascus and Cairo became the main assembly points for the pilgrims. While pilgrims from Syria, Iraq, and Iran, and Anatolia regions joined the Damascus caravan, those from North Africa and Sub-Saharan regions joined the Cairo caravan.

The Hajj routes

In medieval Iraq, the principal gathering points for the pilgrims were Kufa and Basra where the former was connected to the Hejaz region by the Way of Zubayda. This Iraqi route started from Kufa, ran through Fayd (a place near Jabal Shammar in central part of Saudi Arabia), crossed the Nejd region (a region in central Saudi Arabia), proceeded to Medina, and then reached Mecca. In medieval Syria, the departure point for the pilgrims was Damascus. This Syrian route started from Damascus, and heading south, reached Al-Karak and then Ma'an (both are in present-day Jordan), crossed through  Tabuk (a place in north-western Saudi Arabia),  Hijr (now Mada'in Saleh ), and Al-'Ula (in north-western Saudi Arabia, 380 km north of Medina), then proceeded to Medina, and then reached Mecca. From the Umayyad period until Ottoman times, the town of Ma'an served as a market place for the pilgrims on the Syrian route. In the Egyptian route, the pilgrims would gather in Cairo, and after four days, start for the ground of Ajrud (24 kilometers northwest of Suez), and from there they would reach Suez, and crossing the Sinai Peninsula through Al-Nakhl point, they would reach Aqaba (in south part of present-day Jordan), then traveling parallel to Red Sea, they reach Yanbu, then proceed to Medina, and finally reach Mecca. The hajj caravans would start their pilgrimage journey from there, traveled by land or sea and through deserts, and, after the performance of pilgrimage, return there. The total journey would take approximately two to three months on average. 

The pilgrimage to Mecca was mainly an overland journey using camels as a means of transport.  Throughout the history, however, many distant pilgrims from Maghreb, the Indian subcontinent, and Southeast Asia also had to use various sea routes to reach Hejaz. The Anis Al-Hujjaj is an illustrated account of a Hajj taken in 1677 by a member of the Mughal court. With other pilgrims, he crossed in a ship from Surat to Jeddah via Mocha, Yemen. Pilgrims from Maghreb (Tunisia, Algeria, Libya) would travel through the lower coast of Mediterranean sea to reach and join the Cairo caravans. Some pilgrims coming from Africa would cross the Red Sea to reach Hejaz, and then to Mecca.

In Ottoman era

After the Ottomans came into power, the sultans of Ottoman Empire concerned themselves with the management of hajj program, and allocated annual budget for its arrangement. During this period, Damascus and Cairo were still the main points from where the chief hajj caravans would depart and come back. These caravans included thousands of camels for carrying pilgrims, merchants, goods, foodstuff, and water. A lot of people also made their pilgrimage journey on foot. The rulers would supply necessary military forces to ensure security of hajj caravans. Commanders for the caravans leaving from Cairo and Damascus were designated by the Muslim sovereign and were known as Amir al-Hajj. They were in charge of protecting the pilgrims of the caravan, and securing funds and supplies for the journey. Surgeons and physicians were also sent with Syrian caravans to doctor the pilgrims free of costs. During this period, around 20,000 to 60,000 people made their pilgrimage annually.

The mahmal 

A mahmal was a ceremonial passenger-less litter that was carried on a camel among the pilgrim caravan each year from the 13th century to the mid-20th. It symbolised the political power of the sultans who sent it, demonstrating their custody of Islam's holy sites. Mahmals were sent from Cairo, Damascus, Yemen, Hyderabad, Darfur, and the Timurid Empire in different periods.  The arrival of a mahmal in Mecca was a significant occasion which local people and pilgrims came out to watch. Before entry to the city, the simple textiles which had covered the mahmal on its journey were replaced with the kiswah: an ornate, colourful textile embroidered with verses from the Quran and the tughra (emblem) of the sponsoring sultan. Mahmals from different countries competed for the best position in front of the Kaaba. A mahmal returning from Mecca to its city of origin was regarded as carrying barakah (blessing). As the procession returned, parents brought out their children to touch the mahmal, and people briefly put their handkerchiefs inside it.

Taxation on pilgrims

According to Ibn Jubayr, during the period of Fatimid overlordship over the Hejaz, taxes were imposed on the pilgrims by the local rulers of Hejaz at the rate of seven and a half gold dinar per head. Those who were unable to pay them had to suffer extreme physical torture. However, imposing taxes on the pilgrims was considered illegal by the Islamic jurists. After Saladin overthrew the Fatimid Caliphate around 1171 and established the Ayyubid dynasty, attempts were made by him to abolish the taxes on the pilgrims. Saladin's removal of illegal taxes was praised by Ibn Jubayr. Saladin's measures, however, proved insufficient, especially in later times, partly because there were other taxes (like taxes on hajj caravans or camels) and also because the administrative decisions, taken in Damascus or Cairo, were not easy to be applied effectively in Hejaz due to long distance. Some of the later Mamluk sultans – like Baybers and Hassan – made active attempts to control the Meccan local rulers from taxing the pilgrim caravans by compensating the Meccan rulers with annual allocation of a fixed sum of money.
Al-Suyuti mentions that in the year 384 AH (around 994 CE), pilgrims who came from Iraq, Syria, and Yemen to perform hajj went back unsuccessful because they were not allowed to perform hajj without paying tax. Only Egyptian pilgrims performed hajj that year.

The Bedouin issue

Throughout the history of the hajj, the nomadic tribes of desert – known as Bedouin – have been a persistent security issue for the hajj caravans. They often used to attack the caravans – hajj or merchandise – that passed their territories. They had to be paid in exchange for the security of the hajj caravans. The head of the regime would hand over the payment to the Amir al-Hajj – the commander in charge of the hajj caravans – who would then make the payments to the Bedouin according to the demands of the situation. Even then, there were occasional casualties. In 1757 CE, a Bedouin tribe, Bani Sakhr, attacked the hajj caravans that resulted in the death of many pilgrims, immediately and afterwards, as well as other casualties.

Trading activities
Throughout the history, the pilgrimage journey to Mecca had offered the pilgrims as well as the professional merchants the opportunity to conduct various merchandising activities both en route and in Mecca, Damascus, and Cairo. The exemption of customs on land and the security provided to the hajj caravans further made it a lucrative field for trading. Many pilgrims brought goods, produced in their respective lands, in order to sell them, thus becoming an occasional trader, and managing some expenses for hajj trip. According to John Lewis Burckhardt, the Afghans brought coarse shawls, beads of stone, tooth-brush; the European Turks brought shoes, slippers, knit silk purse, embroidered items, and sweetmeats; the Anatolian Turks brought Angora shawls and carpet; the pilgrims of Maghreb brought cloaks made of wool. The professional businessmen conducted large-scale merchandising activities that included transportation of goods between Mecca and their own towns as well as sales alone the hajj route. The Indian and other Eastern goods, brought to Mecca by ships, were purchased by big merchants of Cairo and Damascus who, upon return, then sold them in their own markets. These goods generally included Indian textile, various spices, coffee, drugs, and precious stones.

Hajj certificates 
From the 11th century to the early 20th century, pilgrims could obtain paper Hajj certificates which they would typically display in their homes. The earliest known certificates, from the 11th century, are purely calligraphic works. From the late 12th century onwards, they included depictions of the Kaaba and other holy sites, either hand-painted or woodblock printed. These are some of the earliest surviving figurative depictions of these sites. Over the years, the certificates became more colourful. Being distributed throughout the Muslim world by returning pilgrims, they were used as references for other artistic depictions of the holy sites. They served as maps and guides to the pilgrimage routes. Later certificates listed the rites that a pilgrim had performed at each location, and illustrated the locations in vertical sequence. By confirming the devotional activities of the pilgrim in the sight of Allah, the certificates were seen as a source of barakah (blessing), which was enhanced by them being made near the holy site of Mecca and bearing Quranic text. Certificates that survive include that of the 16th century Ottoman prince Mehmed.

In modern times

During the second half of the nineteenth century (after 1850s), steamships began to be used in the pilgrimage journey to Mecca, and the number of pilgrims traveling on sea route increased. With the opening of Suez Canal in 1869, the travel time for pilgrimage was shortened. Initially, the British ship companies had a monopoly in these steamship business and they offered little facilities to the pilgrims. In 1886, the then government of India adopted some regulations to improve the pilgrimage journey from India to Hejaz. During the early twentieth century, the Ottoman Sultan Abdul Hamid II constructed the Hejaz Railway between Damascus and Medina which further facilitated the pilgrimage journey: the pilgrims traveled in relative ease and reached Hejaz in only four days. Starting from Damascus in September 1900, the railway reached Medina in September 1908 having a span of 1,300 kilometers (810 mi). The railroad was damaged during First World War and Arab Revolt by a force led by British officer T. E. Lawrence. Plague used to break out almost every year until 1918.

After a contract between the Saudi Arabian government and the Misr Airlines of Egypt in 1936, the Misr Airlines introduced the first airline service for Hajj pilgrims in 1937. The subsequent engine trouble of the aircraft disrupted the hajj flights, and the Second World War from 1939 to 1945 caused a decrease in pilgrims' number. Modern transportation systems in the pilgrimage journey effectively began only after the Second World War. Saudi Arabia established the Arabian Transport Company and the Bakhashab Transport Company, in 1946 and 1948, respectively, in order to transport the pilgrims at various Hajj sites which proved highly effective in later years, and the use of camels as a means of transport for pilgrimage journeys virtually ended in 1950. According to one account, during the pilgrimage seasons of 1946–1950, around 80% of the total foreign pilgrims arrived by sea, 10% by land, and 7% by air transport. The 1970s and subsequent decades saw a dramatic increase in the number of pilgrims because of the availability of affordable air travel system.

In 1979, a large group of rebels seized the mosque. This was known as the Grand Mosque seizure. It took many days for authorities to bring the situation under control and the rebels were later executed.

See also 
1757 Hajj caravan raid
History of Islam
Hajj: Journey to the Heart of Islam
Khalili Collection of Hajj and the Arts of Pilgrimage

References

Bibliography
 
 Al-Suyuti, J. Tarikh al-Khulafa (History of the Caliphs).
 
 
  
 
 
 
 
 
 

 
History of Mecca
Islamic pilgrimages